A constitutional referendum was held in the United States Virgin Islands on 7 November 1972. Federal law passed by the United States Congress suggested that a second Constitutional Convention be called after the failure of the previous proposed constitution.

Whilst the new constitution received a majority of votes in favor, turnout was too low and it did not enter into force.

Results

References

Referendums in the United States Virgin Islands
1972 in the United States Virgin Islands
1972 referendums
1972 elections in the Caribbean
Constitutional referendums